Batetsky is a rural locality (a settlement of rural type) and the administrative center of Batetsky District, Novgorod Oblast, Russia, located in the northwest of the oblast, on the banks of the Udrayka River (a right tributary of the Luga). It also serves as the administrative center of Batetskoye Settlement, one of the three settlements into which the district is administratively divided. Municipally, it is the administrative center of Batetskoye Rural Settlement in Batetsky Municipal District. Population:

History
Batetsky was founded in 1891 as a settlement serving the station on the railway between St. Petersburg and Vitebsk. It took its name from the nearby village of Batetsko, or Batetskaya. In 1916, the railway connecting Novgorod and Luga also passed through Batetsky. At the time, the station was a part of Luzhsky Uyezd of Petrograd Governorate.

On October 1, 1927, Batetsky became the administrative center of newly established Batetsky District in Luga Okrug of Leningrad Oblast. On July 23, 1930, the okrugs were abolished, and the districts were directly subordinated to the oblast. Between August, 1941 and February 12, 1944, Batetsky was occupied by German troops. On July 5, 1944, Batetsky District was transferred to newly established Novgorod Oblast. On February 1, 1963 the district was abolished in the course of Khrushchyov administrative reform. On December 30, 1966 Batetsky District was re-established.

Economy

Industry
There are small-scale enterprises of timber industry and food industry.

Transportation
Batetsky is located at the crossing of two railroads: One, in the northern-southern direction, connects St. Petersburg with Velikiye Luki via Dno, and another one, approximately in the southeastern-northwestern direction, connects Veliky Novgorod with Luga.

There is a road network inside the district, connecting Batetsky, in particular, with Veliky Novgorod, Luga, Shimsk, and Soltsy.

References

Notes

Sources

Rural localities in Novgorod Oblast
Batetsky District